Surender Reddy is an Indian film director and screenwriter who works in Telugu cinema. He made his directorial debut with Athanokkade (2005), which won him Nandi Award for Best First Film of a Director. He later directed films such as Kick (2009), Oosaravelli (2011), Race Gurram (2014), Dhruva (2016), and Sye Raa Narasimha Reddy (2019). He won SIIMA Award for Best Director – Telugu for Race Gurram.

Early life 
Reddy was born and brought up in Machanapalli village of Karimnagar district, Telangana. Hailing from an affluent family, Reddy is fourth of six children. His father Veera Reddy worked as the Sarpanch of the village. Surender Reddy discontinued his graduation and moved to Hyderabad to pursue a career in films.

Career 
Initially, he worked as an assistant director for the movie Preminchedi Endukamma (1999). He made his directorial debut with Athanokkade featuring Nandamuri Kalyan Ram. He next directed Ashok (2006), starring Jr NTR and Sameera Reddy.

His noted films are Kick starring Ravi Teja & Ileana D'Cruz and Race Gurram starring Allu Arjun and Shruti Haasan. All the films he directed except for Athanokkade are the stories written by Vakkantham Vamsi.

In 2015, Reddy directed Kick 2 re-uniting with Teja for the sequel of Kick. The film grossed over 6 crore on its opening day, the highest for Teja.

Filmography

Awards and nominations

References

External links 
 

Film directors from Telangana
21st-century Indian film directors
Telugu film directors
1975 births
Living people
People from Karimnagar district
South Indian International Movie Awards winners
Nandi Award winners